The final of the Women's 4x200m Freestyle Relay event at the European LC Championships 1997 was held on Tuesday 1997-08-19 in Seville, Spain.

Results

See also
1996 Women's Olympic Games 4x200m Freestyle Relay
1997 Women's World Championships (SC) 4x200m Freestyle

References
 scmsom results

R